Vlastimil Petržela (born 20 July 1953 in Prostějov) is a Czech football coach and former player. He worked with Zenit Saint Petersburg from 2003 to 2006, winning the silver medals of Russian Premier League in 2003 and reaching the quarterfinal stage of the 2005–06 UEFA Cup. Before Zenit he managed Sparta Prague and Bohemians Prague.

As a player, he appeared for Czechoslovakia at the 1982 FIFA World Cup as a substitute against Kuwait.

Petržela signed a three-year contract as manager of FK Mladá Boleslav in 2002, however before the end of the calendar year it was announced that he was heading to Russia to be the new manager of  Zenit St. Petersburg.

In the 2006/2007 season he coached Sigma Olomouc. Petržela was appointed manager of Neftchi Baku in the summer of 2007, and was sacked six-months later on 5 January 2008.

In the season 2009/10 he coached FK Viktoria Žižkov in the Czech 2. Liga and in the season 2010/11 he became the new coach of MFK Zemplín Michalovce in the Slovak 2. liga. He joined Vlašim in January 2014.

Honours
Sparta Prague
Czech Cup: 1995–96

Zenit Saint Petersburg
Russian Premier League Cup: 2003

Footnotes

References
 
 Profile

External links
 Profile on Official Zenit website 
 Profile on zenit-history.ru

1953 births
Living people
Sportspeople from Prostějov
Czechoslovak footballers
Czechoslovakia international footballers
1982 FIFA World Cup players
FC Zbrojovka Brno players
SK Sigma Olomouc players
FK Hvězda Cheb players
SK Slavia Prague players
Czechoslovak football managers
Czech football managers
Czech First League managers
SK Slavia Prague managers
FC Slovan Liberec managers
AC Sparta Prague managers
Bohemians 1905 managers
FK Mladá Boleslav managers
SK Sigma Olomouc managers
FK Viktoria Žižkov managers
Russian Premier League managers
FC Zenit Saint Petersburg managers
Neftçi PFK managers
MFK Zemplín Michalovce managers
FC Sellier & Bellot Vlašim managers
Expatriate football managers in Azerbaijan
Expatriate football managers in Russia
Expatriate football managers in Slovakia
FC Baník Ostrava managers
Association football forwards
FC Fastav Zlín managers
Czech National Football League managers